Dayana Isabel Calero Sanchez (born 1 May 2002) is a Nicaraguan footballer who plays as a forward for UNAN Managua and the Nicaragua women's national team.

Club career

Diriangén FC
Calero began her playing career in 2015 with Diriangén FC.

UNAN Managua
In August 2020, Calero joined UNAN Managua.

International career 

In August 2016, Calero represented Nicaragua at the 2016 CONCACAF Girls' U-15 Championship.

In November 2021, Calero made her senior debut for Nicaragua in a 5–2 friendly defeat to Costa Rica.

References

2002 births
Living people
Nicaragua women's international footballers
Nicaraguan women's footballers
Women's association football forwards